is a Japanese businessman and racing driver. He won the 2019 FIA Motorsport Games GT Cup along with Ukyo Sasahara, driving a Lamborghini Huracán EVO GT3.

References

1976 births
Living people
Japanese businesspeople
Japanese racing drivers
Super GT drivers
FIA Motorsport Games drivers
Lamborghini Squadra Corse drivers
Le Mans Cup drivers
B-Max Racing drivers